The 2016–17 Cupa Ligii was the third and last official season of the Cupa Ligii. Dinamo București won the title for the first time in its history.

All times are CEST (UTC+2).

Schedule 
 Qualifying Round: 9–11 August 2016
 Quarter-finals: 7–8 September 2016

Prize money 
 Winner:  €265,000
 Runner-up: €165,000
 Semi-final: €50,000
 Quarter-final: €25,000
 Qualifying Round: €20,000

Qualifying round 

At this stage, all teams participate in 2016–17 Liga I season except for No. 1 (Astra Giurgiu) and 2 (FCSB) 2015–16 Liga I season which directly qualified for the quarterfinals. Thus in this phase will be 12 teams will be divided in 6 games. The winners of those matches will qualify for the quarterfinals.

The teams qualified in this phase are:
 FC Astra Giurgiu
 FC Botoșani
 CFR Cluj
 CS Concordia Chiajna
 FC Dinamo București
 Gaz Metan Mediaș
 CSM Studențesc Iași
 CS Pandurii Târgu Jiu
 ACS Poli Timișoara
 Universitatea Craiova
 FC Viitorul Constanța
 FC Voluntari

All matches were played on 9–11 August 2016

Quarter-finals 

At this stage, 8 teams qualified:

Astra Giurgiu – 1st place 2015–16 Liga I season

FCSB – 2nd place 2015–16 Liga I season

the 6 teams that won in Qualifying Round

- Botoșani

- ASA Târgu Mureș

- ACS Poli Timișoara

- Concordia Chiajna

- CFR Cluj

- Dinamo București

These teams will be divided in four matches. The winners of those matches will qualify for the semifinals.

Semi-finals 
Four teams qualified for the semifinals, namely the winners of the quarterfinals. They are:

1) ACS Poli Timișoara

2) ASA Târgu Mureș

3) Steaua București

4) Dinamo București

Matches will be played in two legs. The winners of those matches will qualify for the League Cup final.

1st leg

2nd leg

Final

References 

Cupa Ligii seasons